Ane Azkona Fuente (born 15 July 1998) is a Spanish professional footballer who plays as a forward for Liga F club Athletic Club and the Spain women's national team.

Club career
Azkona started her career playing futsal for Gazte Berriak, a team based in Ansoain. Following this, she spent a year at Ardoi before signing for Athletic Club. On 13 January 2019, she scored her first league goal for Athletic, in the 94th minute of a match against Sporting de Huelva. In the 2019–20 Primera División season, she provided more assists than any other Athletic player and signed a new three-year contract with the club at the end of that season. On 10 June 2020, it was announced that she had torn the anterior cruciate ligament in her right knee during a training session. She returned from this injury over eight months later.

International career
Azkona was part of the Spain under-19 squad which won the 2017 UEFA Women's Under-19 Championship. In October 2019, she was called up to the inaugural squad for España Promesas (essentially Spain B), along with two clubmates. She made her full debut as a late substitute in a 2–0 friendly victory over the United States (played in her hometown Pamplona) in October 2022.

References

External links
 
 
 
 

1998 births
Living people
People from Cuenca de Pamplona
Footballers from Navarre
Spanish women's footballers
Women's association football forwards
Athletic Club Femenino B players
Athletic Club Femenino players
Segunda Federación (women) players
Primera División (women) players
Spain women's youth international footballers
Spain women's international footballers
21st-century Spanish women